Straža pri Moravčah is a small settlement east of Moravče in central Slovenia. The area is part of the traditional region of Upper Carniola. It is now included with the rest of the Municipality of Moravče in the Central Slovenia Statistical Region.

Name
Straža pri Moravčah was attested in historical sources as Wart in 1361. Historically, it was simply known as Straža, and the name was lengthened to Straža pri Moravčah (literally, 'Straža near Moravče') in 1985.

History
Straža pri Moravčah had a population of 40 living in eight houses in 1900. Straža pri Moravčah was annexed by Drtija in 1952, ending its existence as an independent settlement. The settlement was separated again from Drtija in 1985.

References

External links

Straža pri Moravčah on Geopedia

Populated places in the Municipality of Moravče